Luis Jiménez (25 August 1928 – 5 May 1999) was a Mexican fencer. He competed in the individual épée event at the 1956 Summer Olympics.

References

External links
 

1928 births
1999 deaths
Mexican male épée fencers
Olympic fencers of Mexico
Fencers at the 1956 Summer Olympics